"Sunshine After the Rain" is a song by German recording artist Alexander Klaws. The song was written by Svein Finneide, Aslak Johnsen, Ken Ingwersen, and Jon Rydningen, with production helmed by the latter, and recorded for Klaws's second album Here I Am (2004). Released as the album's third single, it reached the top five of the German Singles Chart and entered the top twenty in Austria.

Formats and track listings

Charts

Weekly charts

References

External links
  
 

2004 singles
2004 songs
Alexander Klaws songs
Hansa Records singles